The Antrim Area Hospital is a general hospital in Antrim, County Antrim, Northern Ireland. It is managed by the Northern Health and Social Care Trust.

History
The hospital was commissioned to create extra healthcare capacity in the Antrim area. It was built at a cost of £40 million and was opened by the Prince of Wales in July 1994. In February 2003 it was designated as one of the nine acute hospitals in the acute hospital network of Northern Ireland on which healthcare would be focused under the government health policy 'Developing Better Services'. An extension to the emergency department and an extra 24 bed ward were completed in June 2013.

References 

Northern Health and Social Care Trust
Hospitals established in 1994
1994 establishments in Northern Ireland
Health and Social Care (Northern Ireland) hospitals
Hospitals in County Antrim